Harlow is a large town and local government district located in the west of Essex, England. Founded as a new town, it is situated on the border with Hertfordshire and London, Harlow occupies a large area of land on the south bank of the upper Stort Valley, which has been made navigable through other towns and features a canal section near its watermill. Old Harlow is a historic village founded by the early medieval age and most of its high street buildings are early Victorian and residential, mostly protected by one of the Conservation Areas in the district. In Old Harlow is a field named Harlowbury, a de-settled monastic area which has the remains of a chapel, a scheduled ancient monument.

The M11 motorway passes through to the east of the town. Harlow has its own commercial and leisure economy. It is also an outer part of the London commuter belt and employment centre of the M11 corridor which includes Cambridge and London Stansted Airport to the north. At the time of the 2011 Census, Harlow's population was recorded at 81,944 and its district had the third-highest proportion of social housing in England, 26.9%, a legacy of the 1947 commitment to re-house blitzed London families after World War II and provide a percentage of homes for other needy families who cannot afford market rents.

Etymology

There is some dispute as to where the place name Harlow derives from. One theory is that it derives from the Anglo-Saxon words 'here' and 'hlaw', meaning "army hill", probably to be identified with Mulberry Hill, which was used as the moot or meeting place for the district.

The other theory is that it derives from the words 'here' and 'hearg', meaning "temple hill/mound", probably to be identified with an Iron Age burial mound, later a Roman temple site on River Way.

History

Early history
The earliest deposits are of a Mesolithic (circa 10,000 BC) hunting camp excavated by Davey in Northbrooks in the 1970s (Unpublished) closely followed by the large and unexcavated deposits of Neolithic flint beside Gilden Way. These deposits are mostly known because of the large numbers of surface-bound, worked flint. Substantial amounts of worked flint suggest an organised working of flint in the area. Large amounts of debitage litter the area and tools found include axe heads, hammers, blades, dowels and other boring tools and multipurpose flints such as scrapers. An organised field walk in the late 1990s by Bartlett (unpublished) indicates that most of the area, some 80 hectares, produced worked flint from the Neolithic to the Bronze Age with a smattering of Mesolithic. This indicates organised industry existed from 5000 BC to 2000 BC. The deposits are so large and dispersed that any major archaeological work in the area will have to take this into consideration before any ground work is started. Harlow was in Roman times the site of a small town (around Harlow Mill railway station) with a substantial stone built temple.

Later history

The entry in the Norman Domesday Book reads: Herlaua: St Edmunds Abbey before and after 1066; Geoffrey from Count Eustace; Thorgils from Eudo the Steward; Richard from Ranulf, brother of Ilger. Mill, 7 beehives, 8 cobs, 43 cattle, 3 foals. The mill is now a 300-year-old listed building and restaurant.

The original village, mentioned in the Domesday Book, developed as a typical rural community around what is now known as Old Harlow, with many of its buildings still standing. This includes for instance the Grade II listed St Mary's Church in Churchgate Street.  Its former Chapel is in a ruinous state in a field which was once the Harlowbury Abbey part of Old Harlow, is Grade I listed and is a scheduled ancient monument.

Kingsmoor House on Paringdon Road is a Grade II* listed building and dates from the 18th century. It was built as a gentleman's residence and owned by local families including the Risden, Houblon and Todhunter families. It was later used as a private school and council offices before falling derelict. It has since been restored and converted into residential apartments.

The New Town

The original Harlow New Town was built after World War II to ease overcrowding in London and the surrounding areas due to the devastation caused by the bombing during the Blitz. Harlow was, along with places such as Basildon, Stevenage and Hemel Hempstead a result of the New Towns Act of 1946, with the master plan for Harlow drawn up in 1947 by Sir Frederick Gibberd. The town was planned from the outset and was designed to respect the existing landscape. Sylvia Crowe, the landscape architect, worked on Harlow New Town between 1948 and 1958. A number of landscape wedges - which later became known as Green Wedges - were designed to cut through the town and separate the neighbourhoods of the town. The development incorporated the market town of Harlow, now a neighbourhood known as Old Harlow, and the villages of Great Parndon, Latton, Tye Green, Potter Street, Churchgate Street, Little Parndon, and Netteswell. Each of the town's neighbourhoods is self-supporting with its own shopping precincts, community facilities and pubs. Gibberd invited many of the country's leading post-war architects to design buildings in the town, including Philip Powell and Hidalgo Moya, Leonard Manasseh, Michael Neylan, E C P Monson, Gerard Goalen, Maxwell Fry, Jane Drew, Graham Dawbarn, H. T. Cadbury-Brown and William Crabtree.  Harlow has one of the most extensive cycle track networks in the country, connecting all areas of the town to the town centre and industrial areas.  The cycle network is composed mostly of the original old town roads.

The town's authorities built Britain's first pedestrian precinct, and first modern-style residential tower block, The Lawn, constructed in 1951; it is now a Grade II listed building. Gibberd's tromp-l'oeil terrace in Orchard Croft and Dawbarn's maisonette blocks at Pennymead are also notable, as is Michael Neylan's pioneering development at Bishopsfield. The first neighbourhood, Mark Hall, is a conservation area. From 1894 to 1955 the Harlow parish formed part of the Epping Rural District of Essex. From 1955 to 1974, Harlow was an urban district. On 1 April 1974 the parish and urban district was abolished and it became an unparished area.

The town centre, and many of its neighbourhood shopping facilities have undergone major redevelopment, along with many of the town's original buildings. Subsequently, many of the original town buildings, including most of its health centres, the Staple Tye shopping centre and many industrial units have been rebuilt. Gibberd's original town hall, a landmark in the town built in 1958, was demolished and replaced by a new civic centre and The Water Gardens shopping area in the 2000s.

Redevelopment

Since becoming a new town, Harlow has undergone several stages of expansion, the first of which was the "mini expansion" that was created by the building of the Sumners and Katherines estates in the mid-to-late seventies to the west of the existing town. Since then Harlow has further expanded with the Church Langley estate completed in 2005, and its newest neighbourhood Newhall has completed the first stage of its development, with the second stage underway in 2013. The Harlow Gateway Scheme, also completed, first involved the relocation of the Harlow Football Stadium & the building of a new hotel, apartments and a restaurant adjacent to Harlow Town railway station. Phase 2 of this scheme involved the construction of 530 eco-homes on the former sports centre site and the building of the Harlow Leizurezone adjacent to the town's college in the early 2010s.

Other major developments under consideration include both a northern and southern bypass of the town, and significant expansion to the north, following the completed expansion to the east. The Harlow North plans, currently awaiting permission, involve an extension of the town across the floodplains on the town's northern border, into neighbouring Hertfordshire. The plan was supported by former MP Bill Rammell, all three political groups on Harlow Council, and the East of England Regional Assembly. It is opposed by Hertfordshire County Council, East Herts Council, Mark Prisk, MP for Hertford and Stortford in whose constituency the development would be, and all the parishes concerned. The opposition is coordinated by a local group based in neighbouring East Hertfordshire. An attempt to have Harlow North designated an "Eco Town" was rejected by the Minister for Housing, Caroline Flint MP, in April 2008.

The south of the town centre also underwent major regeneration, with the new Civic Centre being built and the town's famous Water Gardens being redeveloped in the 2000s, a landscape listed by English Heritage. Despite this development, the main shopping area of the town has been stagnating for some time, not helped by the closure of two of the Harvey Centre's anchor tenants - these being BHS and M&S.

In 2004 Harlow businessman Mo Ghadami won his High Court case to block a multimillion-pound extension of the town's Harvey Centre. The Iranian-born entrepreneur, who presented his case in person, persuaded Mr Justice Richards to quash Harlow DC's grant of planning permission for the development. In his judgment he backed Mr Ghadami's claim of 'apparent bias or predetermination' in the decision, as a result of the continued participation of Michael Garnett, the chairman of the planning committee, in the planning process after he had attempted in telephone calls to persuade Mr Ghadami to consent to the scheme.

In 2011 the government announced the creation of an enterprise zone in the town. Harlow Enterprise Zone consists of two separate sites under development, at Templefields and London Road, with the London Road site divided into north and south business parks.

Permitted development (office to residential) flats
A government policy to allow developers to convert office space to residential has led to a proliferation of new 'rabbit hutch'-sized flats, which are then let to London-borough waiting-list families. These are erected under permitted development rights which mean the local authority cannot refuse planning permission.

Environment

A major feature of Harlow New Town is its green spaces; over one third of the district is parkland or fields containing public footpaths. One of the original design features of Gibberd's masterplan is the Green Wedges in the town, designed to provide open space for wildlife and recreation and to separate neighbourhoods. 23% of the district is designated as Green Wedge. The Green Wedges are protected from inappropriate development, through the Local Plan.

The town is entirely surrounded by Green Belt land, a land designation which originated in London to prevent the city sprawling, and 21% of the district is allocated as Green Belt. The National Planning Policy Framework states that one of the purposes of Green Belt land is to protect unrestricted sprawl from large built-up areas.

Harlow Town Park, at a size of 71.6-hectares (just under 1 km2), is one of the largest urban parks in the country. The multi-functional park has been used for recreation and enjoyment for over 50 years.  This park is in the centre Netteswell ward and is between the town centre and the railway station, both of which are within walking distance of the park, which is a natural thoroughfare from the station to the town centre.

There are only 12 parks with significant post-war element on the English Heritage 'Register of Parks'. With these Harlow is seen as one of the first examples of a civic scheme to marry the modern science of town and country planning.

Economy
Harlow was originally expected to provide a majority of employment opportunities in manufacturing, with two major developments of The Pinnacles and Templefields providing the biggest employers in the region; as with the rest of the country, this manufacturing base has declined and Harlow has had to adjust.

The original manufacturing took the form of a biscuit factory, on the Pinnacles. Owned and run as a co-op, it provided employment to the town for over 50 years, before closing in 2002. It has since been demolished and the site now has small industrial units. At its peak, the factory employed over 500 people.

Raytheon and GlaxoSmithKline both have large premises within the town. 
In July 2017 Public Health England had bought the vacant site from GSK (GlaxoSmithKline) hoping to move altogether 2,745 jobs there, of which about 500 are from Porton Down.

Nortel had a large site on the eastern edge of the town, acquired when STC was bought in 1991, and it was here that Charles K. Kao developed optical fibre data transmission. Nortel still has a presence, but it is much reduced. The site now is host to electronics, 
education and housing companies 
One of Europe's leading online golf stores, Onlinegolf, is based in Harlow.

Unemployment is frequently around 10%, higher than the national average in the UK. Harlow also has a large number of people in social housing, almost 30% of dwellings being housing association and local authority owned, and many more privately rented.

Politics

The Member of Parliament (MP) for Harlow since the 2010 general election is Conservative Robert Halfon. He defeated Labour's Phil Waite, his predecessor being Bill Rammell, who had been the MP since the 1997 election, but had only held the seat at the 2005 general election by a majority of 97 votes.

Elections to the district council are held in three out of every four years, with one-third of the 33 seats on the council being elected at each election. Labour had a majority from the first election in 1973 until the 2002 election. From then until the 2008 election no party had a majority with the Liberal Democrats ruling as a minority. The Conservatives gained control in 2008, but lost it back to Labour at the 2012 election and as of the 2018 election the council was composed of the following councillors:-

Transport

Railway
Harlow is served by two railway stations: Harlow Town and Harlow Mill; both are served by trains between London Liverpool Street and Cambridge. There is also a bus service to Epping tube station, which is on London Underground's Central Line.

Road
Harlow can be accessed from junctions 7 and 7a of the M11 motorway, which runs from London to Cambridge; this places it within a short distance of Stansted Airport, the A120 to Braintree, and the orbital M25 motorway. The M11 motorway was planned originally to run to the west of Harlow, not to the east as it does today. Having planned for one of the two big industrial estates to be built to the west of the town for easy motorway access, Sir Fredrick Gibberd was appalled when the motorway was eventually built to the east of the town instead, describing it as "just about the most monstrous thing to ever happen to me as a planner" during a 1982 interview. Running through the town is the A414, a major road between Hemel Hempstead and Maldon; it links the town with the A10 to the west. Another major road running from Harlow is the A1184, which leads to the nearby town of Bishop's Stortford.

Air
Bishop's Stortford is the closest large town to London Stansted Airport, though Harlow is only 10 miles from this major transport hub and therefore provides several hundred airport employees. The airport operator withdrew a planning application for a second runway after the General Election of 2010, when all major political parties opposed it.

Bus

Harlow bus station provides a focal point for the town's extensive bus network and serves as a regional hub for the local area, with operators such as Arriva (Herts and Essex) and Central Connect. On top of the prime routes from Harlow to Stansted Airport, there are links to many other local towns and villages such as Chelmsford, Epping and Bishop's Stortford. The 724 bus, operated by Arriva in Herts and Essex, provides a service between Harlow and Heathrow Airport via Hertford and Watford.

Harlow First Avenue Multi-Modal Corridor

Essex County Council was involved in development to Harlow's First Avenue, which was intended to reduce congestion and create better transport connections between the Newhall housing developments. The scheme was implemented in two phases, each phase focusing on developing First Avenue on either side of Howard Way. Phase two had an estimated cost of £4.4 million and was due to be completed in early 2010, phase one is already complete and is listed as having had £3.6 million of funding from the Community Infrastructure Fund (CIF). The scheme includes construction of a shared use cycleway and development to the bus service along First Avenue and into the Newhall development site where 'high quality bus' services between Harlow town centre and Harlow Town Railway station are listed as part of the intentions of the development.

Healthcare
Harlow is served by the NHS Princess Alexandra Hospital, situated on the edge of The High, which is the main Town Centre area of Harlow. This hospital has a 24-hour Accident & Emergency and Urgent Care Centre.

Education
Harlow contains seven state-funded secondary schools:

Stewards Academy
Mark Hall Academy
St Mark's West Essex Catholic School
Burnt Mill Academy
 Passmores Academy
 Sir Frederick Gibberd College
BMAT STEM Academy

St. Nicholas School is a private school in the town while Harlow College provides sixth form and further education and St Mark's West Essex Catholic School and BMAT STEM Academy also provide sixth form education.

Brays Grove Community School and Specialist Arts College closed down in June 2008 due to decreasing pupil numbers over a number of years. Following the schools closure, the site was demolished and redeveloped into a £23 million state of the art Academy which Passmores School and Technology College relocated to in September 2011 opening as Passmores Academy.

In the 1980s a further two secondary schools were closed, Latton Bush (now a commercial centre and recreational centre) and Netteswell (now forms part of the Harlow College Campus) is a major further educational centre, covering GCSEs, A-Levels, and many vocational subjects including Hair and Beauty Therapy, Construction, Mechanics, ICT, and a new centre for engineering recently opened. The college is currently under major regeneration and is due to open a new university centre in partnership with Anglia Ruskin University, covering mostly Foundation degrees in a variety of subjects relevant to local employers' needs.

An international campus of Memorial University of Newfoundland is located in Old Harlow.

Sport and leisure

Cricket
Harlow Town Cricket Club was formed in 1960 as Stort Cricket Club and plays at Ash Tree Field. The club plays in division 2 of the Shepherd Neame Essex League, runs a junior section that play in the West Essex District Cricket Board League and has a girls team which play other girls teams in the county.

Harlow Town Cricket Club's Pavilion recently underwent a six figure refurbishment to promote women's and disabled cricket in Harlow and the whole of Essex. Essex County Cricket Club Ladies and disability sections use the club as well as the England disability teams.

Harlow has four cricket clubs. Harlow Cricket Club play in Division 3 of the Shepherd Neame Essex League and is based in Old Harlow. The club runs a junior section that play in the West Essex District Cricket Board League. Netteswell and Burnt Mill Cricket Club are based at Harlow Cricket Club, they are a social team that was founded around 1889. Near neighbours Potter Street and Church Langley Cricket Club play in the Herts and Essex League.

Football
The town's football club Harlow Town F.C. play in the Isthmian League South Central Division, having been relegated from the Premier Division in the 2018–19 season.

The club is best known for its extended run in the 1979-80 FA Cup, where they reached the Fourth Round of the competition. This included wins against established Football League sides Southend United and most famously a 1–0 win over Leicester City in a replay, having drawn 1–1 at Filbert Street. Harlow were eventually eliminated by Watford, narrowly losing 4–3.

The club built a new stadium in 2006 at Barrows Farm, now named The Harlow Arena, with the old Harlow Sports Centre being converted into housing.

Les Smith, a Harlow resident, represented Great Britain at the 1992 Barcelona Paralympic Games. Les became one of the first disabled people to become a qualified football coach in 1993.

Greyhound racing
The Harlow Greyhound Stadium has been at its present site for over 20 years and has regular race meetings each week as well as hosting other sporting events.

Rugby Union
Harlow Rugby Football Club moved from Ram Gorse near The Pinnacles to a new location in mid 2017 located on  Howard Way, Latton Bush, Harlow. The former site of the club has been turned into a housing estate affectionately called Ram Gorse Park. The first team plays in the London and South East Division IIl North East league. Currently, the training grounds are located near Pennymead.

Other sports facilities
The town has a leisure facility named the Harlow Leisurezone, built in the late 2000s next to Harlow College as part of the Gateway Project, which replaced the old Harlow Sports Centre, opened in 1960.

In the 2010s, investments have included its skate-park next to Burnt Mill Academy. The project has been funded by the investment of over £300,000, largely from Harlow Council with £57,500 from Sport England. The park is floodlit. The 650sq metre park is made from concrete, and has a bowl as well as a street course which contains quarter pipes, flat banks, rails and steps.

Art and culture

Harlow is the home to a major collection of public sculptures (over 100 in total) by artists such as Auguste Rodin, Henry Moore, Barbara Hepworth, Gerda Rubinstein and Ralph Brown. Many of these are owned by the Harlow Art Trust, an organisation set up in 1953 by the lead architect of Harlow Frederick Gibberd. Gibberd had idealistic notions of the New Town as a place where people who might not normally have access to art could enjoy great sculptures by great artists on every street corner. Consequently, almost all of Harlow's sculpture collection is in the open air, in shopping centres, housing estates and parks around the town.

In 2009 Harlow Council voted to celebrate Harlow's collection of sculpture by branding Harlow as 'Harlow Sculpture Town – The World's First Sculpture Town'. Harlow Sculpture Town began as an initiative from Harlow Art Trust, presenting itself as 'Sculpture Town', in a similar way to Hay-on-Wye's presentation of itself as Booktown.

As part of the 'Sculpture Town' branding, Harlow is also home to the Gibberd Garden, the former home of Frederick and Patricia Gibberd, which is a managed twentieth-century garden, and home to some of the Gibberd's private sculpture collection. The Gibberd Gallery, in the Civic Centre, contains a collection of twentieth-century watercolours and temporary exhibitions.

Harlow's Playhouse Theatre is in the town, which hosts shows and live comedy throughout the year and is the home to local community Arts group "Livewire Theatre" which has provided free arts access to young people since 2001.

Harlow has a local museum, which hold exhibitions and which contains artefacts on Harlow's historic past, charting the story of the town through the ages. Harlow Museum is in Muskham Road, and is set within the grounds of a sixteenth-century manor building with walled gardens. The museum is run in conjunction with the Essex Records Office (ERO) which holds family history archives in the search room. Admission to the museum is currently free, but visitors are encouraged to make a donation to ensure future maintenance of services.

The Town of Harlow and Harlow New Town are cited in the song "Get 'Em Out by Friday", by progressive rock group Genesis, on their 1972 album Foxtrot.

Harlow was home to The Square, named one of the Top 10 Small Venues in the UK by NME, but the venue was closed due to re-development of the site, and was demolished in 2018.

People from Harlow

Twin towns
  Havířov, Czech Republic
  Prague 15, Czech Republic
  Vélizy-Villacoublay, France
  Stavanger, Norway
  Tingalpa, Australia

Arms

References

External links 

 Visit Harlow – a website from Harlow District Council
 Harlow Enterprise Zone

 
Towns in Essex
New towns in England
Non-metropolitan districts of Essex
New towns started in the 1940s
Unparished areas in Essex
Former civil parishes in Essex